Shafi Al-Dossari (born 1 February 1990) is a Saudi Arabian footballer who plays as a left back .

External links
 

1990 births
Living people
Saudi Arabian footballers
Association football defenders
Saudi Professional League players
Al Hilal SFC players
Ittihad FC players
Al-Fateh SC players
Khaleej FC players
Ohod Club players
Place of birth missing (living people)